Ayobami Olaleye professionally known as Phantom is a multi-gold, award-winning Afrobeats record producer, singer, and songwriter. In 2020, he became the third Nigerian Afrobeats producer in history to be certified by Syndicat National de l'Édition Phonographique (SNEP) after Burna Boy’s "Ye" became a certified gold record in France. The song earned him an award at 2019 Soundcity MVP Awards Festival, in the African Producer of the Year category, with a nomination at The Headies, in the Producer of the Year category.

On 8 August 2022, he was cited as one of the producers on the TurnTable Nigeria Producer Top 100 chart, and reached number 17.

Early life and career
Ayobami Olaleye was born in Abule Egba, a suburb area of Lagos, and raised in a polygamous family to Oba-Afolabi Olaleye, who was a businessman, and Titi Olaleye, who was a school headmistress. He had his primary education at St John's Primary School and his secondary education at Vetland Grammar School, before proceeding to study Urban and Regional Planning for his tertiary education, where he graduated with a B.Sc in Urban and Regional Planning from the University of Lagos. In 2022, he shared his early musical experience with The Guardian, saying I grew up in Lagos, listening to African folk music, being influenced by Ebo Taylor, Manu Dibango, and Fela Kuti.

Phantom began creating music in 2007 after his friend introduced him to the music digital software Fruity Loops. He tells Adedayo Laketu of MoreBranches "I started making beats professionally in 2010 and since then its been fulfilling, yet challenging journey". He achieved recognition for his work on Burna Boy's 2018 single "Ye". In 2018, he co-produced the Headies award-winning Best R&B/Pop Album The Mayor of Lagos by Mayorkun. In 2022, he signed a global publishing deal with BMG Rights Management, through BMG UK. His production hits include "Diana" by Fireboy DML & Chris Brown, "Skeletun" by Tekno, "The Benz" by Spotless, "Bolanle" by IVD & Zlatan, and "Sugarcane" by Camidoh.

Discography

Singles

Production discography

Singles produced

Selected albums/eps produced

Accolades

References 

Living people
Nigerian record producers
Nigerian songwriters
Year of birth missing (living people)